The ninth season of Degrassi: The Next Generation premiered in Canada on October 4, 2009, concluded on July 16, 2010, and consists of twenty-three episodes (19 episodes, and 1 movie). Degrassi: The Next Generation is a Canadian serial teen drama television series. Although only one school year passed in the story timeline since season six, season nine is set in the spring semester in which the years it aired. Writers have been able to use a semi-floating timeline, so that the issues depicted are modern for their viewers. This season continues to depict the lives of a group of high school freshmen, juniors and seniors, and graduates as they deal with some of the challenges and issues that young adults face such as drug abuse, sexting, sexually transmitted diseases, sexual identity, homosexuality, crime, sex, and relationships.

Production for the season began on May 19, 2009 at Epitome Pictures' studios in Toronto, Ontario. The final episodes of the season were filmed in part in New York City, New York, and were written and directed by Stefan Brogren, who plays Archie "Snake" Simpson. This was the first season to air on TeenNick in the United States, and to have some Canadian premieres on MuchMusic.

Cast

The ninth season features twenty-four actors who receive star billing with twenty of them returning from the previous season.

Main cast
 Charlotte Arnold as Holly J. Sinclair (20 episodes)
 Landon Liboiron as Declan Coyne (18 episodes)
 Raymond Ablack as Savtaj "Sav" Bhandari (18 episodes)
 Aislinn Paul as Clare Edwards (17 episodes)
 Jessica Tyler as Jenna Middleton (17 episodes)
 Shane Kippel as Gavin "Spinner" Mason (17 episodes)
 Jajube Mandiela as Chantay Black (16 episodes)
 Dalmar Abuzeid as Danny Van Zandt (16 episodes)
 Jamie Johnston as Peter Stone (15 episodes)
 Samantha Munro as Anya MacPherson (15 episodes)
 Paula Brancati as Jane Vaughn (13 episodes)
 Annie Clark as Fiona Coyne (12 episodes)
 Sam Earle as K.C. Guthrie (12 episodes)
 A.J. Saudin as Connor DeLaurier (12 episodes)
 Melinda Shankar as Alli Bhandari (12 episodes)
 Jahmil French as Dave Turner (12 episodes)
 Stefan Brogren as Archie "Snake" Simpson (11 episodes)
 Scott Paterson as Johnny DiMarco (9 episodes)
 Judy Jiao as Leia Chang (7 episodes)
 Jordan Hudyma as Blue Chessex (5 episodes)
 Argiris Karras as Riley Stavros (5 episodes)
 Cassie Steele as Manuela "Manny" Santos (5 episodes)
 Mike Lobel as Jay Hogart (5 episodes)
 Natty Zavitz as Bruce the Moose (5 episodes)
 Miriam McDonald as Emma Nelson (5 episodes)

Recurring cast
 Joy Tanner as Mrs. Laura Coyne (7 episodes)
 Linlyn Lue as Ms. Laura Kwan (7 episodes)
 Melissa DiMarco as Daphne Hatzilakos (6 episodes)
 Damon Runyan as Coach Carson (6 episodes)
 Kyra Azzopardi as Trish (6 episodes)
 Michael Kinney as Coach Darryl Armstrong (5 episodes)
 Doug Morency as Mr. Bince (4 episodes)
 Rick Jon Egan as Mr. Lavigne (4 episodes)
 James Edward Campbell as Mark Fitzgerald (4 episodes)
 Scott Beaudin as Ethan McBride (4 episodes)
 Jennifer Podemski as Ms. Chantel Sauvé (3 episodes)
 Birchmount Park Collegiate Institute as Basketball Team (3 episodes)
 Joe Bostick as Todd (3 episodes)
 Tom Melissis as Mr. Dom Perino (3 episodes)
 Blessed Cardinal Newman Catholic High School as Cheerleaders (3 episodes)
 Suresh John as Gamal (3 episodes)
 Dylan Miles as Grade 9 Math Student (3 episodes)
 Nina Dobrev as Mia Jones (2 episodes)
 Shileen Paton as Victoria (2 episodes)
 Wesley Morgan as Sam (2 episodes)
 Paula Boudreau as Ms. Dawes (2 episodes)
 Jonathan Seinen as Larping Boy (2 episodes)
 Anna-Kate Shand as Katie (2 episodes)
 Rebecca Williams as Larissa (2 episodes)
 Team Impact as Wrestling Team (2 episodes)
 Susan Hamann as Mary-Kate Sinclair (2 episodes)
 Joanne Reece as Female Panelist (2 episodes)
 Erin Simms as Stacie (2 episodes)
 Amanda Stepto as Christine "Spike" Nelson (2 episodes)
 Sarena Parmar as Farrah Hassan (2 episodes)
 Mishu Vellani as Mrs. Bhandari (2 episodes)
 Jessi Cruickshank as Kristin (2 episodes)
 Forbes March as George (2 episodes)
 Rudy Webb as Doorman (2 episodes)
 Elizabeth Lofranco as Intern #1 (2 episodes)
 Ian MacIntyre as Intern #2 (2 episodes)
 Ian Blackwood as George's Keyboardist (2 episodes)

Guest stars
 Ed Robertson as Mr. Fowler (1 episode)
 Kevin Jubinville as The Shep (1 episode)
 Gina Clayton as Anna Jones (1 episode)
 Larissa Vouloukos as Isabella Jones (1 episode)
 Aiden Simko as Male Model (1 episode)
 Ron Bell as Truck Driver (1 episode)
 Riley Jones as Hot Tub Jumper (1 episode)
 John MacDonald as Security Guard (1 episode)
 Jon-Paul Khouri as Fashion Photographer (1 episode)
 Jordan Gavaris as Nathan (1 episode)
 Cory Doran as Referee (1 episode)
 Jess Mal Gibbons as Officer Turner (1 episode)
 Tracy Shreve as Mrs. Turner (1 episode)
 Michelle Mallen as Doctor (1 episode)
 Jonathan Potts as Mr. K (1 episode)
 Aimee Lococo as Mom At The Dot GRILL (1 episode)
 Kate Parker as Babysitting Instructor (1 episode)
 Bruce Hunter as Gerry Halliwell (1 episode)
 Alina Usataia as Cute Girl #1 (1 episode)
 Heidi Hatcher as Cute Girl #2 (1 episode)
 Yasmine Ali as Cute Girl #3 (1 episode)
 Nicole Martin as Cute Girl #4 (1 episode)
 Coral Fraser as Cute Girl #5 (1 episode)
 Rischan Donaldson-Fuller as Kid With Accordion (1 episode)
 John Paul Ruttan as Pirate Boy (1 episode)
 Gary Eisler as Waiter (1 episode)
 Chris Tarpos as Student (1 episode)
 Adamo Ruggiero as Marco Del Rossi (1 episode)
 Tim Daugulis as Kyle Middleton (1 episode)
 Jacob Neayem as Male Student (1 episode)
 Evan Williams as Kelly Ashoona (1 episode)
 Joseph Pierre as Drug Cop (1 episode)
 Raquel Gil-Jimenez as Pastel (1 episode)
 Alexander Broughton as Pothead (1 episode)
 Fritz Helder and The Phantoms as Themselves (1 episode)
 Joe Vercillo as Roadie (1 episode)
 Marvin L. Ishmael as Mr. Bhandari (1 episode)
 Laura Miyata as Lindsay (1 episode)
 Indiana Jagait as Mr. Hassan (1 episode)
 Rishma Malik as Mrs. Ameena Hassan (1 episode)
 Spencer Van Wyck as Wesley Betenkamp (1 episode)
 Shannon Kook-Chun as Zane Park (1 episode)
 Karla Jang as Yoga Instructor (1 episode)
 Horace Abel as Security Guard (1 episode)
 Eric Johnston as Degrassi School Drummer (1 episode)
 Lizz Alexander as Tattoo Artist (1 episode)
 Burlington Teen Tour Band as Graduation Band (1 episode)
 Lainey Lui as herself (1 episode)
 Jay Manuel as himself (1 episode)
 Tyler Kyte as Drummer in Sweet Thing (1 episode)
 Nicholas Rose as Guitarist & Background Vocalist in Sweet Thing (1 episode)
 Morgan Waters as Bass Player in Sweet Thing (1 episode)
 Owen Carrier as Lead Vocalist in Sweet Thing (1 episode)
 Ryan Carrier as Busker (1 episode)
 R.O. Glasgow as Card Dealer (1 episode)
 Kenny Hotz as Ron (1 episode)
 Colin Mochrie as Larry (1 episode)
 Mary Murphy as Sales Clerk (1 episode)
 Sydney Van Delft as Chloe (1 episode)
 Jelena Zivanovic as Morgan (1 episode)
 Anna Cyzon as Siobhan (1 episode)
 Sarah Barrable-Tishauer as Liberty Van Zandt (1 episode)
 Robin Craig as Mrs. Mason (1 episode)

Beginning this season, Stefan Brogren, Miriam McDonald, Shane Kippel, and Cassie Steele are the only original cast members to still appear in the series.

Joining the main cast are Annie Clark, Jahmil French, Landon Liboiron, and Jessica Tyler as Fiona Coyne (12 episodes), Dave Turner (12 episodes), Declan Coyne (18 episodes), and Jenna Middleton (17 episodes).

The five actors from season eight who did not return this season are Sarah Barrable-Tishauer as Liberty Van Zandt, Lauren Collins as Paige Michalchuk, Marc Donato as Derek Haig, Jake Epstein as Craig Manning, and Stacey Farber as Ellie Nash. All left the series, while Sarah Barrable-Tishauer, Nina Dobrev, Adamo Ruggiero, and Evan Williams all guest starred this season.

Crew
Season nine was produced by Epitome Pictures in association with CTV. Funding was provided by The Canadian Film or Video Production Tax Credit and the Ontario Film and Television Tax Credit, the Canadian Television Fund and BCE-CTV Benefits, The Shaw Television Broadcast Fund, the Independent Production Fund, Mountain Cable Program, and RBC Royal Bank.

Linda Schuyler, co-creator of the Degrassi franchise and CEO of Epitome Pictures, served as an executive producer with her husband, and President of Epitome Pictures, Stephen Stohn. Brendon Yorke is also credited as an executive producer again. David Lowe was the producer, and Stephanie Cohen the supervising producer. As well as playing Snake Simpson, Stephen Brogren also served as a producer, and, for the first time, directed episodes, after previously writing, producing, and directing the exclusive online series Degrassi Minis. The casting director was Stephanie Gorin, and the editor was D. Gillian Truster.

The executive story editor was Sarah Glinski, and Matt Heuther the story editor. The script supervisor was Nancy Markle. Episode writers for the season are Duana Taha and Brendon Yorke. The director of photography was Jim Westenbrink, and the director was Phil Earnshaw.

Reception
Linda Schuyler, Stefan Brogren, David Lowe, Stephen Stohn, Stephanie Williams, and Brendon Yorke, along with Epitome Pictures, were nominated for the 25th Gemini Awards for best children's or youth fiction program or series, for producing Degrassi: The Next Generation, but lost to Overruled!. Directors Phil Earnshaw and Stefan Brogren were nominated for "Just Can't Get Enough (Part 2)" and "Beat It (Part 2)" respectively, for best direction in a children's or youth program or series, Brogren would win. On screen couple Landon Liboiron (Declan Coyne) and Charlotte Arnold (Holly J. Sinclair) were nominated for best performance in a children's or youth program or series, for "Waiting for a Girl Like You" and "Somebody" ("Love Games, Parts 1 & 2") respectively, Arnold would win. Linda Schuyler was honoured with the Academy Achievement Award. The following year "Degrassi Takes Manhattan" was nominated for best sound in a dramatic program, but lost to the first episode of The Pillars of the Earth miniseries. At the 2010 Young Artist Awards, Jamie Johnston and Aislinn Paul were nominated as a Leading Young Actor and Supporting Young Actress in the Best Performance in a TV Comedy or Drama Series, Laytrel McMullen and A.J. Saudin were also nominated as a Guest Starring Young Actress and Recurring Young Actor 14 and Over in the Best Performance in a TV Series.

Episodes
The first half of this season included a number of two-part episodes that aired on the same night on CTV, and MuchMusic later in the week. "Just Can't Get Enough" was an hour-long season premiere, and "Beat It" and "Heart Like Mine" were two-part episodes that aired on the same night in Canada, however on consecutive weeks in the US. Episodes 904 & 906 and 903 & 905 also aired together in Canada, to follow the ongoing story lines. The second half of the season premiered on MuchMusic, at one episode a week, then CTV a couple of weeks later in back-to-back format again. The first episode to have its Canadian premiere on MuchMusic was "Why Can't This Be Love? (Part One)". The US had aired the first half of the season by order of production, but opened the second half with the two-part "Why Can't This Be Love?", which was on consecutive weeks in Canada. In the US, four episodes were renamed by TeenNick, in both the TV spots, and the on-screen titles. This list is by order of production, as they appear on the DVD.

DVD release
The release of season nine was made available online and on DVD in select stores by Echo Bridge Home Entertainment in the US on July 20, 2010; this is the third season not to be released by Alliance Atlantis Home Entertainment in Canada or by FUNimation Entertainment in the US. As well as every episode from the season, the release features the Degrassi Takes Manhattan movie, and bonus material including deleted scenes, bloopers and behind-the-scenes featurettes.

References

External links
 List of Degrassi: The Next Generation episodes at IMDB.

Degrassi: The Next Generation seasons
2009 Canadian television seasons
2010 Canadian television seasons